Pam Duncan-Glancy (born 2 November 1981) is a Scottish Labour politician who has been a Member of the Scottish Parliament (MSP) for the Glasgow region since May 2021. She is the first permanent wheelchair user elected to the Scottish Parliament.

Early life and career 
Duncan-Glancy has a BSc in Psychology and an MSc in Health Psychology from the University of Stirling, and a Postgraduate certificate in Citizenship and Human Rights from Glasgow Caledonian University. She sat on the Commission on Strengthening Local Democracy and on the Commission on Parliamentary Reform. Prior to her election, she worked in public health communications for NHS Health Scotland.

Political career 
Duncan-Glancy contested Glasgow North for the general elections in 2017 and 2019, but came second to Patrick Grady, the incumbent SNP MP. She received a 34.5% share of the vote in 2017 and a 31.4% share in 2019.

On 1 March 2021, despite not being a parliamentarian at the time, she became Scottish Labour's spokesperson for Social Security in the Scottish Parliament.

After being a Labour member for approximately twenty years, Duncan-Glancy became a Member of Scottish Parliament (MSP) in 2021. Duncan-Glancy stood in Glasgow Kelvin in 2021 and came third to SNP candidate Kaukab Stewart, but was elected on the Glasgow regional list on 8 May 2021. During the election count, Duncan-Glancy received significant coverage as she highlighted the issues disabled candidates face when she was denied access to the Glasgow vote count due to the venue's lack of accessibility.

References

External links 
 
 Pam Duncan-Glancy’s Website: www.GlasgowPam.scot

1981 births
Living people
Place of birth missing (living people)
Alumni of the University of Stirling
Alumni of Glasgow Caledonian University
British politicians with disabilities
Wheelchair users
Labour MSPs
Members of the Scottish Parliament 2021–2026